Kokawa  is a village in the administrative district of Gmina Mykanów, within Częstochowa County, Silesian Voivodeship, in southern Poland.

The village has a population of 583.

Notable people
Artur Barciś, actor

References

Kokawa